Ullerslev is a town in central Denmark, located in Nyborg municipality on the island of Funen in Region of Southern Denmark. Ullerslev was until 2007 the seat of Ullerslev Municipality.

History
Ullerslev was first mentioned in 1320 as 'Ulwersleff'.

Ullerslev Church (Danish: Ullerslev Kirke) was built around year 1150, and expanded later around year 1200. The crucifix is from 1520, and the church's two bells are from 1433 and 1906.

Notable residents
Vilhelm Munk Nielsen (born 1955), football player

References

Cities and towns in the Region of Southern Denmark
Populated places in Funen
Nyborg Municipality